1978–2008 is an album by Australian band Matt Finish that was released in January 2008 under the Mammal Music record label celebrating the band's 30th anniversary. The album is an anthology of the band's best-known songs, including Short Note plus three previously released songs, all freshly recorded before Christmas 2007.

Australian journalist Deb Laylor writes: "Music is next to laughter as medicine for the soul and I could easily OD on this dose. This CD has helped me cope and deal with all things in life. It has been in the player and I still haven't and don't expect to tire of it."

Track listing

Personnel

Musicians 
David Adams – vocals, guitar
Harry Brus – bass, vocals
Parrish Muhoberac – guitar, vocals
John Prior – drums, keys, vocals

Production 
Recorded and produced at Unity Gain Studios by John Prior
Mastered at King Willie Sound by William Bowden

References

External links
Hotsource article

Matt Finish compilation albums
2008 compilation albums